Flagstaff Glacier is a very small glacier lying immediately north of Flagstaff Hill on Keller Peninsula, King George Island, in the South Shetland Islands. The name arose locally in about 1958 and derives from association with Flagstaff Hill.

See also
 List of glaciers in the Antarctic
 Glaciology

References 

 

Glaciers of King George Island (South Shetland Islands)